Bedser is an English surname. Notable people with the surname include:

 Sir Alec Bedser (1918–2010), Surrey and England cricketer, twin brother of Eric
 Alec Bedser (South African cricketer) (1948–1981), South African cricketer
 Eric Bedser (1918–2006), Surrey cricketer

English-language surnames